Mossie Walsh is an Irish retired sportsperson. He played hurling with the Waterford senior inter-county team and won an All Star award in 1980, being picked in midfield.

References

External links
GAA Info Profile

Living people
Waterford inter-county hurlers
Year of birth missing (living people)
Place of birth missing (living people)